1964–65 was the 18th season of the Western International Hockey League.

Standings

 Kimberley Dynamiters      26-18-4-56
 Spokane Jets              25-20-3-53
 Nelson Maple Leafs        24-22-2-50
 Trail Smoke Eaters        22-23-3-47
 Rossland Warriors         16-30-2-34

Playoffs

Semi finals (best of 5)
 Nelson Maple Leafs defeated Spokane Jets 3 games to 0 (6-4, 7-6, 5-2)
 Kimberley Dynamiters defeated Trail Smoke Eaters 3 games to 1 (2-1, 6-2, 3-10, 3-2)

Final (best of 7)
 The Nelson Maple Leafs defeated The Kimberley Dynamiters 4 games to 3 (5-1, 2-3, 1-3, 5-4, 3-5, 9-6, 6-2)

The Nelson Maple Leafs advanced to the 1964-65 Western Canada Allan Cup Playoffs.

References 

Spokane Daily Chronicle - 10 Oct 1964
Spokane Daily Chronicle - 31 Oct 1964
The Spokesman-Review - 17 Nov 1964
The Spokesman-Review - 20 Nov 1964
Spokane Daily Chronicle - 17 Dec 1964
The Spokesman-Review - 19 Dec 1964
The Spokesman-Review - 19 Dec 1964
Tri City Herald - 21 Dec 1964
The Spokesman-Review - 29 Dec 1964
The Spokesman-Review - 9 Jan 1965
Spokane Daily Chronicle - 19 Jan 1965
The Spokesman-Review - 12 Feb 1965
The Spokesman-Review - 27 Feb 1964
Spokane Daily Chronicle - 13 Mar 1965

Western International Hockey League seasons
Wihl
Wihl